Accountability, in terms of ethics and governance, is equated with answerability, blameworthiness, liability, and the expectation of account-giving. As in an aspect of governance, it has been central to discussions related to problems in the public sector, nonprofit and private (corporate) and individual contexts. In leadership roles, accountability is the acknowledgment and assumption of responsibility for actions, products, decisions, and policies including the administration, governance, and implementation within the scope of the role or employment position and encompassing the obligation to report, explain and be answerable for resulting consequences.

In governance, accountability has expanded beyond the basic definition of "being called to account for one's actions". It is frequently described as an account giving relationship between individuals, e.g. "A is accountable to B when A is obliged to inform B about A's (past or future) actions and decisions, to justify them, and to suffer punishment in the case of eventual misconduct" and more. Accountability cannot exist without proper accounting practices; in other words, an absence of accounting means an absence of accountability. Another key area that contributes to accountability is good records management.

History and etymology
"Accountability" stems from late Latin accomptare (to account), a prefixed form of computare (to calculate), which in turn derived from putare (to reckon).
While the word itself does not appear in English until its use in 13th century Norman England, the concept of account-giving has ancient roots in record keeping activities related to governance and money-lending systems that first developed in Ancient Egypt, Israel, Babylon, Greece, and later, Rome.

Political 
Political accountability is when a politician makes choices on behalf of the people and the people have the ability to reward or sanction the politician. In representative democracies citizens delegate power to elected officials through periodic elections in order to represent or act in their interest. The challenge then becomes why would rulers with such power, who presumably have divergent interests from the people, act in the best interest of the people? Citizens can rely on rewards or sanctions to threaten or reward politicians who might otherwise act in a manner that is antithetical to the people's interest. Accountability occurs when citizens only vote to re-elect representatives who act in their interests, and if representatives then select policies that will help them be re-elected. "Governments are 'accountable' if voters can discern whether governments are acting in their interest and sanction them appropriately, so that those incumbents who act in the best interest of the citizens win reelection and those who do not lose them."

Representatives can be held accountable through two mechanisms: electoral replacement and rational anticipation. In electoral replacement citizens vote to replace representatives who are out of step with their interests. Rational anticipation requires that representatives anticipate the consequences of being out of step with their constituency and then govern in accordance with citizens' wishes to avoid negative consequences. Accountability can still be achieved even if citizens are not perfectly knowledgeable about representative's actions as long as representatives believe that they will be held accountable by citizens they will still act in accordance with the citizens' interests.

Electoral 
Electoral accountability refers to citizens using the vote to sanction or reward politicians, but other forms of political accountability do exist.

Some researchers have considered the accountability using formal theory, which makes assumptions about the state of the world to draw larger conclusions. Voters can hold representatives accountable through the process of sanctioning, voters voting the incumbent out of office in response to poor performance. While politicians face a decrease in vote share as a result of poor performance, they are less likely to see an increase in vote share for good performance. Selection, voters choosing candidates based on who will best represent their interests, is another method by which voters hold their representative accountable. These methods of accountability can occur simultaneously with voters holding representatives accountable using sanctioning and selection. These conclusions rely on the assumption that voters do not observe the policy implemented by the incumbent, but do know their own welfare.

Some factors make it harder for voters to sanction incumbents. When politicians do not have control over the outcomes, then accountability breaks down because it is harder to hold them accountable. Further, when organizations are unable to monitor elections and provide information to voters, then voters struggle to sanction the incumbent. Thus, when voters have more information about the incumbent's performance, the incumbent is more likely to voter sanctioning. Further, when incumbents face sanctioning, challengers are more like to enter the race.

While elections are believed to generally increase government accountability to citizens, it may lead to less egalitarian policy outcomes, since those that hold government accountable tend to be from wealthier segments of society. For example, a study of elected versus appointed property assessors in the state of New York shows that when property assessors are elected, it leads to policies that severely undertax wealthier homes relative to poorer homes.

Administrative 
Refer to the liability of government servants to give a satisfactory account of the use of their power and resources. It is often that power corrupts and absolute power corrupts absolutely. Therefore, checking the accountability is the basis of the success of Public Administration.

Public goods 
Politicians may be incentivized to provide public goods as a means of accountability. The ability of voters to attribute credit and blame of outcomes also determines the extent of public goods provision. Research suggests that public goods provision is conditional on being able to attribute outcomes to politicians as opposed to civil servants. This can be enhanced by more short-run and visible inputs and outcomes such as famine relief or drinking water, whereas low-visibility issues such as sanitation and education may be more difficult to attribute credit and thus less likely to provided.

Another condition determining how voters use the provision of public goods to hold leaders accountable is whether the prioritization of public goods is determined either directly via vote or delegated to a governing body. An experiment in New Mexico regarding proposed spending during the state's 2008 special summer legislative session provides evidence that legislators update their positions when learning about voters' policy preferences, indicating representative democracy can increase accountability when politicians learn about voters' preferences. A 2016 experiment in Afghanistan regarding rural development projects, however, finds that when voters directly prioritize their preferences at the ballot box, they perceive the quality of local government to be higher than when a governing committee prioritizes development projects. These contrasting outcomes highlight the trustee-vs-delegate debate, though the lack of objective superior outcomes in projects decided by vote as opposed to committee in the Afghanistan experiment indicate neither is superior to the other in determining which public good should be given priority.

Other research indicates voters use elections to hold politicians accountable for the provision of public goods. In India, rural areas are charged a flat rate for electricity, but in the province of Uttar Pradesh, line loss - electricity that is consumed but not billed bill - is significantly higher in election years relative to non-election years and increases in line loss reliably predict electoral gains. To put this in context, voters rewarded incumbent politicians with a 12% increase in party seats in response to a 10% increase of unbilled electricity in 2007 elections. In Ghana, the improvement of road conditions is linked to increasing vote share for incumbent parties. Both of these research outcomes hinge on the context of voters being able to attribute the service of public goods to politicians, however.

Politicians may also have incentives to respond to pressure for public goods provision in electoral autocracies. There is evidence that as autocratic governments lose seats in their party legislatures, they respond by increasing spending on public goods such as education, healthcare, and pensions. There is further evidence suggesting higher quality of life, civil liberties, and human development in electoral autocracies, lending credence to the theory that autocratic rulers use elections as a bellwether against popular discontent and citizen opposition and in turn increase public goods provision to dampen grievances of disgruntled citizens, even in non-democracies.

While the introduction of elections is generally thought to improve public goods provision, in some cases researchers have shown that it may reduce its quality. For example, the introduction of direct elections for local district office in Indonesia resulted in political interference in the hiring process for bureaucrats in the public education sector, reducing the quality of education provision: politicians were incentivized to dole out patronage positions in the education sector, especially in election years, and where such positions were added, student test scores were lower.

Non-electoral 
Governments are held accountable if citizens can punish and/or reward the government to influence it to pursue the best interests of citizens. While scholars who study democratic theory emphasize the role of elections in ensuring accountability, another strand of scholars investigates non-electoral forms of accountability in democracies and non-democracies and the conditions that make unelected leaders represent the interests of the general public.

Political protest 
Political changes after protests can be the result of the protests per se or symptoms of shifts in political preferences underneath the observable phenomena of the protests. One study of the Tea Party movement in the United States has shown that protests per se have an impact on political change. Other scholars have studied the effect of protests on political changes in developing countries. Mass protests instigated by economic hardship and political repression occurred in 16 sub-Saharan African countries, and 21 governments in the region implemented significant political reforms such as adoption of multiparty elections. Authoritarian regimes in Africa distorted the market and reduced the cost of farm produce in favor of urban workers at the cost of rural farmers in the 1980s to prevent urban unrest, which is more visible and easier to mobilize than rural protests.

Selectorate 
Belsky et al. point out, whereas, under more democratic governance accountability is built into the institution of the state by a habit of regular elections, accountability in autocratic regimes relies on a selectorate; a group that legitimizes or delegitimizes the autocrats powers according to selectorate theory. The primary mechanism at a selectorate's disposal is deposition, which is a form of exit. Beyond that institutions can act as credible restraints on autocracy as well.

Civil society 
In democracies, voluntary associations, interest groups, and associational activity can improve the performance of the government. One study has also shown that civil society organizations such as NGOs can increase the performance of local government according to the central government's standards by monitoring and disclosing information about local government performance in authoritarian regimes like China. Solidary groups – groups based on shared moral obligations and interests – in rural China, where members of the group share moral obligations and interests, can hold local officials accountable as well.

At the local level, various accountability measures exist that impact the job performance of elected officials. In Uganda, civil society organizations (CSOs) that divulge to the public how well an incumbent is performing their job duties, in a district with an upcoming competitive election, increases the performance of the politician for the rest of their term. In contrast to these works, meta-analysis released in 2019 uncover no effects from CSO voter information campaigns on political accountability after examining the results from seven trials across six countries. In Ghana, election-day monitoring of polling centers for district-level positions, as well as gaining awareness of monitoring in an upcoming election, increases job performance among incumbents as these officials spent more of their annual Constituency Development Fund allocations from the central government on public goods for the electorate. In locales with weaker institutions, when citizens elect leaders with higher levels of competency, these officials have a greater ability to overcome the barriers of bad informal institutions and deliver more goods anShared d long-term investment projects for the constituency without needing to raise their taxes. Additionally, many local elections are for positions that involve performing jobs with a single function, such as school board member or sheriff. These elected officials are held accountable to their positions mainly through the information provided to the public through the media. When the media focuses attention on data trends associated with these positions, constituents are then able to use this information to retrospectively vote for or against the incumbent based on the performance shown while in office.

Public opinion poll 
Approval ratings generated through public opinion polling create a measure of job performance during an incumbent's term that has implications for whether the official will retain their seat, or if reelection will even be sought. These approval ratings are predictors of election outcomes when combined with other factors included in Bayesian Model Averaging forecasts. In the United States, senator job approval ratings affect whether a senator will retire, the quality of candidates that seek to challenge the incumbent, the amount of money the senator can raise to seek reelection if they decide to run, and the outcome of the election itself. Thus, strategic incumbent senators will seek reelection less when their approval ratings are low during their time in office.

Accountability for unelected leaders

Threat or fear of losing power 
Selectorates are those on whom a leader depends in order to hold onto power and those who have the ability to depose a leader. When selectorates' hold on power is not overly dependent on the leader in office, selectorates can remove poorly performing leaders, and this accountability by selectorates render it possible for autocracies to perform better for the benefit of all.

Moral standing and social norms 
The solidary groups in rural China can hold local officials accountable when 1) the solidary group encompasses everyone under the local government's jurisdiction, and 2) local officials are embedded in the group as members; the recognition from these groups encourages local officials to carry out their official tasks as they value high moral standing in the group.

Shared interests 
Traditional leaders in Zambia provide local public goods despite the fact that they lack an electoral incentive to provide public goods. Many customary chiefs never leave the communities they lead permanently and depend on local sources for a significant portion of their income, thus, traditional leaders may facilitate bringing local public goods in the present and benefit from the community's development over time just like stationary bandits in Olson's argument.

Accountability and corruption 
Political corruption refers to "the misuse or the abuse of public office for private gains", where corrupt practices include fraud, appropriation of public funds, or accepting bribes are some examples of corrupt practices. Corruption can be negative for politicians' evaluations, since citizens' may perceive corruption as a signal of poor performance, motivating them to sanction the incumbent. In fact, the model of retrospective voting that suggests that voters incentivize good politicians' behavior by rewarding good and punishing bad performance, citizens are expected to sanction corrupt politicians. However, recent studies suggest that, though voters have a general distaste for corruption, they often fail to punish corrupt incumbents; and that some of them also receive benefits from their representatives' corrupt practices, and prefer to retain this type of politicians. Moreover, in high-corrupt contexts, voters may become more tolerant or even prefer corrupt politicians because others are also perceived as corrupt, leading to a corrupt equilibrium "where voters are generally willing to retain corrupt politicians", which is referred to as a "political corruption trap". The high corruption equilibrium is difficult to break due to the interaction between corrupt politicians, voters who tolerate and retain corrupt politicians, and potential entrants or challengers who are also apt to engage in corrupt practices, leading to the maintenance of corruption.

Democracy as a whole seems to have a null effect on reducing corruption, while economic development is associated with a decrease in corruption.  Freedom of the press contributes to the reduction of corruption, by exposing these actions. In fact, documentation on how a corrupt government (Fujimori's government from 1998 to 2000, in Peru) strategically undermined check and balance institutions, suggests that the media —e.g. newspapers and, mainly, television— is crucial, due to its broad scope to disseminate information to the public. Additionally, there is also evidence about the importance of local media —such as local radio stations— in holding accountable corrupt incumbents and promoting non-corrupt politicians. Nevertheless, information about corruption may not only lead to vote losses for the incumbent parties, but also for the challenger parties, as well to the erosion of partisan attachments, which implies that information about corruption also provokes citizens' disengagement from the political process.

Scholarly literature about corruption finds mixed results about the role of political institutions on the level of a country's corruption. For example, some scholarly research suggests that more horizontal accountability, or oversight across branches of government, would generally decrease corruption. However, other research shows that increased oversight could increase corruption when actors in one branch can pressure actors in another to collude: in Ghana bureaucrats are more likely to engage in corruption on behalf of politicians when politicians have higher levels of discretion to oversee the bureaucracy (e.g., by threatening to transfer noncompliant bureaucrats).

Low accountability for corruption is difficult to combat, and some anticorruption activities may also lead to perverse consequences.  For example, in places where private sector work pays better than public sector work (e.g., China), highly qualified individuals engaging in public sector work may only find such work attractive because they allow for further compensation through corrupt activities; government anticorruption activities can therefore decrease the quality and overall representativeness of the bureaucracy as a result. On the other hand, there is evidence that points out to the fact that, despite strategic evasion and unintentional consequences, anti-corruption initiatives are beneficial, as they allow to lower malfeasance and increases social welfare, even where strategic evasion is relatively large.

Organizational

Ethical

Within an organization, the principles and practices of ethical accountability aim to improve both the internal standard of individual and group conduct as well as external factors, such as sustainable economic and ecologic strategies. Also, ethical accountability plays a progressively important role in academic fields, such as laboratory experiments and field research. Debates around the practice of ethical accountability on the part of researchers in the social field – whether professional or others – have been thoroughly explored by Norma R.A. Romm in her work on Accountability in Social Research, including her book on New Racism: Revisiting Researcher Accountabilities, reviewed by Carole Truman in the journal Sociological Research Online. Here it is suggested that researcher accountability implies that researchers are cognizant of, and take some responsibility for, the potential impact of their ways of doing research – and of writing it up – on the social fields of which the research is part. That is, accountability is linked to considering carefully, and being open to challenge in relation to, one's choices concerning how research agendas are framed and the styles in which write-ups of research "results" are created.

Security 

The traceability of actions performed on a system to a specific system entity (user, process, device). For example, the use of unique user identification and authentication supports accountability; the use of shared user IDs and passwords destroys accountability.

Individuals within organizations
Because many different individuals in large organizations contribute in many ways to the decisions and policies, it is difficult even in principle to identify who should be accountable for the results. This is what is known, following Thompson, as the problem of many hands. It creates a dilemma for accountability. If individuals are held accountable or responsible, individuals who could not have prevented the results are either unfairly punished, or they "take responsibility" in a symbolic ritual without suffering any consequences. If only organizations are held accountable, then all individuals in the organization are equally blameworthy or all are excused. Various solutions have been proposed. One is to broaden the criteria for individual responsibility so that individuals are held accountable for not anticipating failures in the organization. Another solution, recently proposed by Thompson, is to hold individuals accountable for the design of the organization, both retrospectively and prospectively.

Accountability is an element of a RACI to indicate who is ultimately answerable for the correct and thorough completion of the deliverable or task, and the one who delegates the work to those responsible.

Public/private overlap
With the increase over the last several decades in public service provided by private entities, especially in Britain and the United States, some have called for increased political accountability mechanisms for otherwise non-political entities. Legal scholar Anne Davies, for instance, argues that the line between public institutions and private entities like corporations is becoming blurred in certain areas of public service in the United Kingdom, and that this can compromise political accountability in those areas. She and others argue that some administrative law reform is necessary to address this accountability gap.

With respect to the public/private overlap in the United States, public concern over the contracting of government services (including military) and the resulting accountability gap has been highlighted recently following the shooting incident involving the Blackwater security firm in Iraq.

In education 
Student accountability is traditionally based on hang school and classroom rules, combined with sanctions for infringement. As defined by National Council on Measurement in Education (NCME), accountability is "A program, often legislated, that attributes the responsibility for student learning to teachers, school administrators, and/or students. Test results typically are used to judge accountability, and often consequences are imposed for shortcomings."

In contrast, some educational establishments such as Sudbury schools believe that students are personally responsible for their acts, and that traditional schools do not permit students to choose their course of action fully; they do not permit students to embark on the course, once chosen; and they do not permit students to suffer the consequences of the course, once taken. Freedom of choice, freedom of action, freedom to bear the results of action are considered the three great freedoms that constitute personal responsibility. Sudbury schools claim that Ethics' is a course taught by life experience". They adduce that the essential ingredient for acquiring values—and for moral action is personal responsibility, that schools will become involved in the teaching of morals when they become communities of people who fully respect each other's right to make choices, and that the only way the schools can become meaningful purveyors of ethical values is if they provide students and adults with real-life experiences that are bearers of moral import. Students are given complete responsibility for their own education and the school is run by a direct democracy in which students and staff are equals.

Media and accountability

Econometric research has found that countries with greater press freedom tend to have less corruption. Greater political accountability and lower corruption were more likely where newspaper consumption was higher in data from roughly 100 countries and from different states in the US. Congressmen who receive less press coverage are less likely to produce a positive impact for their constituencies, they are less likely to stand witness before congressional hearings, and federal spending for the district is lower. One explanation for the positive impact of media on accountability stems from Besley and Burgess' work. They argue that media resolves the information asymmetries between citizens and government and provides a way of overcoming obstacles preventing political action. When elected officials and the public gain information, the public is better equipped to hold politicians accountable and politicians are more responsive. Ferraz & Finan demonstrate this in the Brazilian context. In their work, they find releasing audit reports prior to elections creates a more informed electorate which holds incumbent officials accountable.

While large evidence supports the positive impact of press freedom on political accountability, other work has highlighted the significance of factors such as media concentration and ownership as government tools for influencing or controlling news content. Non-democratic regimes use media for a variety of purposes such as – (i) to enhance regime resilience, (ii) censor or (iii) strategically distract the public. Control of the media may also be especially beneficial to incumbents in new or developing democracies, who consider media control a spoil of office.

An analysis of the evolution of mass media in the US and Europe since World War II noted mixed results from the growth of the Internet: "The digital revolution has been good for freedom of expression [and] information [but] has had mixed effects on freedom of the press": It has disrupted traditional sources of funding, and new forms of Internet journalism have replaced only a tiny fraction of what's been lost. Various systems have been proposed for increasing the funds available for investigative journalism that allow individual citizens to direct small amounts of government funds to news outlets or investigative journalism projects of their choice.

Electoral manipulation and accountability 
Studies on political accountability have emphasized the key role of elections in promoting accountability in democratic settings. It is through elections that citizens hold governments accountable for past performance. However, the role of elections in fostering accountability is often undermined by electoral manipulation and fraud. By preventing citizens from removing leaders through elections based on their performance in office, electoral manipulation breaks down accountability and may even undercut the consolidation of democratic institutions.

Electoral manipulation is not rare: some estimates point out that in the last two decades up to one fourth of elections suffered some form of substantial manipulation. This includes a large array of pre-election and election-day tactics, such as outlawing rival parties and candidates, employing violence and intimidation, and manipulating voter registration and vote count. Some efforts at improving accountability by preventing electoral manipulation and fraud have obtained a certain measure of success, such as using cell-phone applications for monitoring and disseminating polling station results and employing domestic or international election observers. However, governments sometimes simply shift the type or the place of manipulation in order to deceive observers and monitoring agencies.

Governments, politicians and political parties are more likely to resort to electoral manipulation and fraud when they believe they might be removed from office and face few institutional constraints to their power. Alternatively, low political competition has also been linked to some forms manipulation, such as abolishing presidential term limits. Further, well-connected candidates are more likely to resort to vote count fraud. However, governments may engage in electoral manipulation not only to obtain victory at a given election or to remain longer in office, but also for post-election reasons such as reducing the strength of the opposition and increasing their own bargaining power in the subsequent period.

Standards
Accountability standards have been set up, and organizations can voluntarily commit to them. Standards apply in particular to the non-profit world and to Corporate Social Responsibility (CSR) initiatives. Accountability standards include:
 INGO Accountability Charter, signed by a large number of NGOs to "demonstrate their commitment to accountability and transparency"
 AccountAbility's AA1000 series. "principles-based standards to help organisations become more accountable, responsible and sustainable. They address issues affecting governance, business models and organizational strategy, as well as providing operational guidance on sustainability assurance and stakeholder engagement"
 Humanitarian Accountability Partnership (HAP) 2010 standards. A standard for humanitarian organizations to help them "design, implement, assess, improve and recognize accountable programmes"
In addition, some non-profit organizations set up their own commitments to accountability:
 Accountability, Learning and Planning System (ALPS) by ActionAid, a framework that sets out the key accountability requirements, guidelines, and processes.

See also

Footnotes

References
 Bovens, Mark. The Quest for Responsibility: Accountability and Citizenship in Complex Organisations (Cambridge University Press, 1998).
 Mastop, Rosja. "Characterising Responsibility in Organisational Structures: The Problem of Many Hands" in Deontic Logic in Computer Science, eds. G. Governatori and G. Sartor (Berlin: Springer-Verlag, 2010). pp. 274–287. 
 Thompson, Dennis F. "Responsibility for Failures of Government: The Problem of Many Hands," American Review of Public Administration 44:3 (2014), 259–273.
 Thompson, Dennis F. "The Responsibility of Advisers" in Restoring Responsibility: Ethics in Government, Business and Healthcare (Cambridge University Press, 2005), pp. 33–49.

Further reading
 Mark Bovens, "Two concepts of accountability: accountability as a virtue and as a mechanism," West European Politics 33 (2010), 946–967.
 Sterling Harwood, "Accountability," in John K. Roth, ed., Ethics: Ready Reference (Salem Press, 1994), reprinted in Sterling Harwood, ed., Business as Ethical and Business as Usual (Wadsworth Publishing Co., 1996).
 David Luban, Alan Strudler, and David Wasserman, "Moral Responsibility in the Age of Bureaucracy," Michigan Law Review 90 (1992), 2348–2392.
 Romm, Norma RA (2001) Accountability in Social Research. New York: Springer. 
 Dennis Thompson, "The Responsibility of Advisers" in Restoring Responsibility: Ethics in Government, Business and Healthcare (Cambridge University Press, 2005), pp. 33–49. 
 Williams, Christopher (2006) Leadership accountability in a globalizing world. London: Palgrave Macmillan.
 Painter-Morland Mollie, Ghislain Deslandes, (2015), "Authentic leading as relational accountability: Facing up to the conflicting expectations of media leaders", Leadership, online available 2 April, DOI:1742715015578307.

External links

Citizens' Circle for Accountability
Accountability Initiative
Organizational Realities – Accountability: What Does It Really Mean?
International Budget Partnership: What We Do

 
Democracy
Euthenics
Evaluation
Issues in ethics
Political corruption
Social concepts